, known by his stage name , is a Japanese actor, voice actor and singer from Tokyo. He is married and has a son and a daughter.

His voice tends to land him in the roles of characters with high-pitched voices and utterly sadistic personalities. As a voice actor, he is best known for his roles in Soreike! Anpanman (as Baikinman), Dragon Ball series (as Tambourine, Frieza, Cooler, Chilled and Frost), Touch (as Ishami Nishimura), Niko Niko Pun (as Porori), Do-Re-Mi-Fa Donuts (as Resshi), Hotch Potch Station (as Echikettojii-san), Moomin (as Sniff), Topo Gigio (as Topo Gigio), Bleach (as Mayuri Kurotsuchi), One Piece (as Caesar Clown), indigo and Beast King GoLion (as Takashi Shirogane)

Filmography

Television animation
1960s
Uchū Patrol Hopper (1965) – Jun (first voice)
Animal 1 (1968) – Tomoharu Takeo, Tōichirō 
Attack No. 1 (1969) – Student
1970s
Akaki Chi no Eleven (1970) – Hayato Taki (second voice)
Marvelous Melmo (1971) – Shogo Chikaishi
Kum-Kum (1975) – Roman
3000 Leagues in Search of Mother (1976) – Miguel
1980s
Mighty Atom (1980) – Sam
Ashita No Joe 2 (1980) – Carlos Rivera
Beast King GoLion (1981) – Takashi Shirogane, Ryō Shirogane
Thunderbirds 2086 (1982) – Sammy Edkins Junior
Igano Kabamaru (1983) – Igano Kabamaru
Touch (1985) – Isami Nishimura
Anmitsu Hime (1986) – E.T.
Dragon Ball (1988) – Tambourine
Saint Seiya (1988) – Kraken Isaac
Soreike! Anpanman (1988) – Baikinman
Chimpui (1989) – Majirō
City Hunter 3 (1989) – Toru Kazama
Jungle Emperor (1989) – Totto
Time Patrol Pon (1989) – Louie
1990s
Dragon Ball Z (1990) – Frieza
Delightful Moomin Family (1990) – Sniff
Holly the Ghost (1991) – Toreppā
Montana Jones (1994) – Alfred Jones
Don't Leave Me Alone, Daisy (1997) – Iwan
Dragon Ball GT (1997) – Frieza
Monster Farm (1997) – Taichō Rōdorannā
AWOL -Absent Without Leave- (1998) – Pete Kuruten
Cowboy Bebop (1998) – Rocco Bonnaro
Devilman Lady (1998) – Jason Bates
Weiß Kreuz (1998) – Farfarello
Yu-Gi-Oh (1998) – Trump Bomber
2000s
Baby Felix (2000) – Marty
Gakkō no Kaidan (2000) – Amanojaku
Shinzo (2000) – Gyaza
One Piece (2001) – Whirlwind Eric, father, Indigo, Caesar Clown
Digimon Frontier (2002) – Lucemon (Falldown Mode and Satan Mode)
Jing: King of Bandits (2002) – Kir
Midnight Horror School (2002) – Yumyum
Pecola (2002) – Saruyama-san
Rockman.EXE (2002) – Snakeman
Requiem from the Darkness (2003) – Mataichi
Beet the Vandel Buster (2004) – Shaggy
Bleach (2005) – Mayuri Kurotsuchi
Buzzer Beater (2005) – Han
Ginga Legend Weed (2005) – Smith
Kaiketsu Zorori (2005) – Akuma (devil)
Rockman.EXE Beast (2005) – ZoanoSnakeman
Demashita! Powerpuff Girls Z (2006) – Kare, advertisement narration
Gintama (2006) – DarakuD.Gray-man (2007) – EshiPrincess Resurrection (2007) – ShigaraMokke (2007) – IzunaMononoke (2007) – GenkeiShōnen Onmyōji (2007) – Chishiki no Gūji
GeGeGe no Kitarō (fifth series) (2008) – OnmorakiRosario + Vampire (2008) – Tadashi WanibuchiScarecrowman (2008) – CrashDragon Ball Kai (2009) – FriezaGolgo 13 (2009) – AsshuSōten Kōro (2009) – Narration
2010sNaruto Shippuden (2010) – NekomataThe World God Only Knows (2010) – KodamaSuite PreCure (2011) – NoisePersona 4: The Animation (2012) – Ameno-SagiriDoraemon (2012) – MajimeBakumatsu Rock (2014) – Yoshida ShōinMushishi: The Next Chapter (2014) – SuguroSpace Dandy (2014) – MinatoOne-Punch Man (2015) – Vaccine ManRin-ne (2015) – Fireworks Seller (Episode 21)Dragon Ball Super (2016) – Frieza, FrostHaikyū!! (2016) – Tanji WashijōACCA: 13-Territory Inspection Dept. (2017) – Falke IIPop Team Epic (2018) – Popuko (Episode 3-B)How to Keep a Mummy (2018) – AayanGaro: Vanishing Line (2018) – KingMagical Girl Site (2018) – NanaSkull-face Bookseller Honda-san (2018) – MajutsushiThe Ones Within (2019) - WallMix (2019) – Isami Nishimura
2020sOda Cinnamon Nobunaga (2020) – Matsunaga "Buu" HisahideLapis Re:Lights (2020) – Board Game (Episode 5)Bleach: Thousand-Year Blood War (2022) – Mayuri KurotsuchiRent-A-Girlfriend (2022) – Katsuhito IchinoseTrigun Stampede (2023) – William Conrad

Original video animation (OVA)Armored Trooper Votoms: The Last Red Shoulder (1985) – Murza MelymBaribari Legend (1987) – Hideyoshi HijiriCrying Freeman (1988) – Huáng Dé-YuánArmored Trooper Votoms: The Red Shoulder Document: Roots of Ambition (1988) – Murza MelymLegend of the Galactic Heroes (1989) – Louis MashengoWizardry (1991) – FrankChameleon (1992) – Akio KugoDragon Ball Z Side Story: Plan to Eradicate the Saiyans (1993) – Frieza, CoolerArmitage the Third (1995) – Rene D'anclaudeGolgo 13 "Queen Bee" (1998) – Thomas WolsonPsychic Force (1998) – Brad KilstenRurouni Kenshin: Trust & Betrayal (1999) – IizukaAlien Nine (2001) – BorgUsagi-chan de Cue!! (2001) – Chou of BentenJing, King Of Bandits: Seventh Heaven (2004) – KirSaint Seiya: The Lost Canvas (2009) – IcelusDragon Ball: Episode of Bardock (2011) – Chilled, Frieza

Theatrical animationDoraemon: Nobita's Little Star Wars (1985) – NCIA soldierSaint Seiya (1987) – Christ (Ghost Saint of Southern Cross)The Five Star Stories (1989) – DecorsSoreike! Anpanman series (1989–) – BaikinmanDragon Ball Z: Cooler's Revenge (1991) – Cooler, FriezaDragon Ball Z: The Return of Cooler (1992) – Metal-CoolerDragon Ball Z: Fusion Reborn (1995) – FriezaThe Doraemons series (1997–2001) – El Matadora (third voice)Jigoku Sensei Nūbē: Gozen 0 Toki Nūbē Shizu (1997) – PierroMeitantei Conan: 14 Banme no Target (1998) – Kohei SawakiBlade of the Phantom Master (2004) – ByunBleach: Memories of Nobody (2006) – Mayuri KurotsuchiBleach: The DiamondDust Rebellion (2007) – Mayuri KurotsuchiBleach: Fade to Black (2008) – Mayuri KurotsuchiOne Piece Film: Strong World (2009) – Dr. IndigoWelcome to the Space Show (2010) – NeppoGo! Princess Precure (2015) – Night PumpkinDragon Ball Z: Resurrection 'F' (2015) – FriezaDragon Ball Super: Broly (2018) – FriezaShimajiro to Ururu no Heroland (2019) - Takoyaki MaskSeven Days War (2019) – High-Level Politician

Television dramaTaiyō ni Hoero! (1982) – GeorgeYūsha Yoshihiko (2011) – Demon King Galius (voice)

Radio dramaCat's Eye (xxxx) – Toshio Utsumi

Drama CDHayō no Tsurugi (xxxx, first CD) – AnshuWeiss Kreuz Dramatic Image Album Vier & Fünf: Schwarz Ein & Zwei (xxxx) – FarfarelloChouai (xxxx) – Yuuta HagiwaraPsychic Force Sound Story (xxxx) – Brad KilstenKyuuketsuhime Miyu Seiyou Shinma-hen (xxxx) – Cait Sith

Video gamesDragon Ball series – Frieza, Cooler, Kuriza, TambourineCosmic Fantasy (1990) – BaronKaze no Densetsu Xanadu (1994) – JiidoPsychic Force (1995) – Brad KilstenPuzzle Bobble 4 (1998) – Develon, Madame LunaTail Concerto (1998) – FoolAce Combat 3: Electrosphere (1999) – Simon Orestes CohenSuper Puzzle Bobble (1999) – DevelonPersona 2: Innocent Sin (1999) – Tatsuya SudōBōken Jidai Katsugeki Goemon (2000) – ShujakuThe Bouncer (2000) – Kou LeifouHarry Potter and the Philosopher's Stone (2001) – Professor Quirinus Quirrell (Japanese dub)Kidō Senshi Gundam: Gihren no Yabō: Zeon Dokuritsusenzō Ki (2002) – Thomas KurutsuRaijin Ping-Pong (2002) – KaijiKidō Senshi Gundam: Senshitachi no Kiseki (2004) – Thomas KurutsuKingdom Hearts II (2005) – LingMusashi: Samurai Legend (2005) – ShirazBattle Stadium D.O.N (2006) – FriezaBanjo-Kazooie: Nuts & Bolts (2008) – Narrator (Japanese dub)El Shaddai: Ascension of the Metatron (2011) – SarielDemons' Score (2012) – DavidGenso Suikoden: Tsumugareshi Hyakunen no Toki (2012) – ZoshiomuOne Piece: Unlimited World Red (2013) – Caesar ClownSaint Seiya: Brave Soldiers (2013) – Kraken IsaacBakumatsu Rock (2014) – Shoin YoshidaChaos Rings III (2014) – ShyamalanJ-Stars Victory VS (2014) – FriezaOne Piece: Super Grand Battle! X (2014) – Caesar ClownOne Piece Kings (2014) – Caesar ClownGranblue Fantasy (2014) – Anre (Uno)Lego Dimensions (2015) – The Riddler (Japanese dub)Star Ocean: Anamnesis (2016) – CoroYakuza 6: The Song of Life (2016) – Katsumi SugaiSpider-Man (2018) – Scorpion (Japanese dub)Nioh 2 (2020) – Imagawa YoshimotoValkyrie Elysium (2022) – Fenrir

TokusatsuUltra Q (1966) – Mamoru (ep. 13)Denshi Sentai Denjiman (1980) – Go Fubuki (Actor) (ep. 26)Tokusou Sentai Dekaranger (2004) – Rainian Agent Abrella Tokusou Sentai Dekaranger The Movie: Full Blast Action (2004) – Rainian Agent AbrellaTokusou Sentai Dekaranger vs. Abaranger (2004) – Rainian Agent AbrellaUltraman Mebius & Ultraman Brothers (2006) – Alien NackleKamen Rider Den-O (2007) – Jelly Imagin (ep. 19 – 20) Kamen Rider Kiva (2008) – Ladybug Fangire (ep. 19 – 20) Tensou Sentai Goseiger (2010) – Bugntes Alien Ucyuseruzo of Influenza (ep. 5)Kaizoku Sentai Gokaiger the Movie: The Flying Ghost Ship (2011) – Rainian Agent Abrella (voice)Shuriken Sentai Ninninger (2015) – Masakage Tsugomori (eps. 13 – 44)

Dubbing roles

Live action film and series Japanese dubbingAnd Just Like That... – Steve Brady (David Eigenberg)Conan the Barbarian (1989 TV Asahi edition) – Subotai (Gerry Lopez)ER – Duncan Stewart (Ewan McGregor)G-Force – Speckles (Nicolas Cage)The Glenn Miller Story (2000 TV Tokyo edition) – Chummy MacGregor (Harry Morgan)Hannibal – Mason Verger (Gary Oldman)Lucky Stars Go Places – Long Legs (Anthony Chan)Mission: Impossible – Rogue Nation – Solomon Lane (Sean Harris)Mission: Impossible – Fallout – Solomon Lane (Sean Harris)The Mummy (2002 NTV edition) – Jonathan Carnahan (John Hannah)Prisoners (2016 BS Japan edition) – Franklin Birch (Terrence Howard)Some Like It Hot (2012 Wowow edition) – Gerald/"Daphne" (Jack Lemmon)Wasabi (2004 TV Tokyo edition) – Maurice/Momo (Michel Muller)West Side Story (1979 TBS edition) – Chino Martin (Jose De Vega)

Animated film and series Japanese dubbingAaahh!!! Real Monsters – IckisAnastasia – BartokAnimaniacs – Yakko WarnerBeauty and the Beast: The Enchanted Christmas – FifeDarkwing Duck – Drake Mallard/Darkwing DuckDinosaur – ZiniDonkey Kong Country – Cranky KongFernGully: The Last Rainforest – Batty KodaHop – PhilLady and the Tramp – TrampLady and the Tramp II: Scamp's Adventure – TrampLegend of the Three Caballeros – José CariocaMulan – LingMulan II — LingThe Reflection – JimThe Road to El Dorado – MiguelThe Secret Life of Pets – SnowballThe Secret Life of Pets 2 – SnowballShazzan – Chuck (Under his birthname, "Tomoharu Takeo")
Star Wars: The Clone Wars (film) – Ziro the Hutt
Star Wars: The Clone Wars (TV) – Ziro the HuttThe Swan Princess – Jean-BobThe Swan Princess: The Mystery of the Enchanted Kingdom – Jean-BobThe Swan Princess II: Escape from Castle Mountain – Jean-BobThe Three Caballeros (1994 dub ver) – José CariocaTiny Toon Adventures – Buster BunnyTom and Jerry Tales'' – Droopy

3D ride Japanese dubbing
The Amazing Adventures of Spider-Man – Electro

Awards

References

External links
  
 
 

1951 births
Living people
Japanese male child actors
Japanese male musical theatre actors
Japanese male singers
Japanese male video game actors
Japanese male voice actors
Japanese theatre directors
Male voice actors from Tokyo
20th-century Japanese male actors
21st-century Japanese male actors
Tokyo Actor's Consumer's Cooperative Society voice actors
81 Produce voice actors